Dau Dayal Joshi  was a former member of Lok Sabha from Kota (Lok Sabha constituency). He was elected to Lok Sabha from Kota in 1989, 1991 and 1996. He was a leader of Bharatiya Janata Party.
He was an ayurveda medical practitioner by profession .

He was born at Kota in 1931 and studied at Sanskrit Pathshala, Kota and Delhi Vidyapeeth, Delhi.

He joined politics and became a member and later Mayor of Kota Municipal Corporation. Ayurveda and  Sanskrit language are his special interests .

External links 
 

People from Kota, Rajasthan
Rajasthan municipal councillors
Mayors of places in Rajasthan
Rajasthani politicians
1931 births
Living people
India MPs 1989–1991
India MPs 1991–1996
India MPs 1996–1997
Lok Sabha members from Rajasthan
Bharatiya Janata Party politicians from Rajasthan